Axinidris namib is a species of ant in the genus Axinidris. Described by Snelling in 2007, the species is endemic to Namibia.

References

Endemic fauna of Namibia
Axinidris
Hymenoptera of Africa
Insects described in 2007